Tonko House LLC is an independent animation studio located in Berkeley, California, founded in July 2014 by former Pixar art directors, Robert Kondo and Daisuke Tsutsumi.

The company is best known for its first animated Oscar nominated short film, The Dam Keeper, which was released in 2014, the same year the company was founded.

Filmography
 The Dam Keeper (TBA, in development) 
 Leo (TBA, in development)

Short films
 The Dam Keeper (2014)
 Moom (2016, in collaboration with Marza Animation Planet and Craftar)

Television
 Pig: The Dam Keeper Poems (2017)
 Go! Go! Cory Carson (2020, production design)
 Oni: Thunder God's Tale (2022, in collaboration with Dwarf Animation and Megalis)
 Sleepy Pines (TBA, in development)

Books

Graphic novels
 The Dam Keeper (2017, a collaboration with First Second Books)
 The Dam Keeper: World Without Darkness (2018, a collaboration with First Second Books)
 The Dam Keeper: Return From The Shadows (2019, a collaboration with First Second Books)

Accolades

Academy Awards

Annie Awards

References

External links
 Official Website

American animation studios
Mass media companies established in 2014
Companies based in Berkeley, California
2014 establishments in California